Kimhi or Kimchi is a surname. Notable people with the surname include:

Alona Kimhi (born 1963), Israeli author and actress
David Kimhi (1160–1235), rabbi, biblical commentator, philosopher and grammarian
Joseph Kimhi (1105–1170), rabbi, biblical commentator and poet, father of David and Moses Kimhi
Moses Kimhi (c. 1127 – c. 1190), biblical commentator and grammarian
Shavit Kimchi (born 2002), Israeli tennis player
Solomon Kimhi  (fl. 1862), Turkish rabbi

See also
Khimki, Russian city

Kimchi (disambiguation)

Jewish surnames
Hebrew-language surnames